William A. Starke Memorial is a public art work by American artist Robert Ingersoll Aitken, located in the Forest Home Cemetery on the south side of Milwaukee, Wisconsin. The artwork is a bronze figure depicting a seated angel. It is located in Section 33 of the cemetery at 2405 W. Forest Home Ave. 

The work commemorates William Starke, a local business man involved with the C.H. Starke Bridge Company, the Christopher Steamship Company, and the Sheriff Manufacturing Company.

References

Outdoor sculptures in Milwaukee
1921 establishments in Wisconsin
1921 sculptures
Bronze sculptures in Wisconsin
Monuments and memorials in Wisconsin
Sculptures of angels
Statues in Wisconsin